Mainstream Publishing was a publishing company in Edinburgh, Scotland. Founded in 1978, it ceased trading in December 2013. It was associated with the Random House Group, who bought Mainstream in 2005.

Notable publications 
Its publications include Magnus Magnusson's Fakers, Forgers and Phoneys (2005), Trevor White's  Kitchen Con: Writing on the Restaurant Racket (2006), Gordon Haskell 's Autobiography The Road to Harry's Bar: Forty Years on the Potholed Path to Stardom (2006),  Gordon Brown's  Britain's Everyday Heroes (2007), Henry Allingham's Kitchener's Last Volunteer (2008) (with Denis Goodwin), and  Mukesh Kapila's Against a Tide of Evil (2013).

References 

1978 establishments in Scotland
Book publishing companies of Scotland
Companies based in Edinburgh
Publishing companies established in 1978